TKEY (transaction key) is a record type of the Domain Name System. TKEY RRs can be used in a number of different modes to establish shared keys between a DNS resolver and server.

TKEY record format

Mode field values
 0 - Reserved
 1 - Server assignment
 2 - Diffie-Hellman exchange
 3 - Generic Security Service Algorithm for Secret Key Transaction
 4 - Resolver assignment
 5 - key deletion
 6–65534 - available
 65535 - reserved;

See also
 Domain Name System
 List of DNS record types

References
 , "Secret Key Establishment for DNS (TKEY RR)", D. Eastlake, September 2000

DNS record types